Melametopia is a genus of flies in the family Chamaemyiidae.

Species
M. carbonaria (Loew, 1873)

References

Chamaemyiidae
Lauxanioidea genera